Tapkeshwari Temple is a Hindu temple dedicated to goddess Tapkeshwari situated in a valley surrounded by the hills. The Tapkeshwari hill range is situated south to the city of Bhuj, Kutch district, Gujarat, India.

Caves
The hills have several caves.

Flora and fauna
The hill range is habitat of several types of flora and fauna.

References

Caves of Gujarat
Bhuj
Geography of Kutch district
Hindu temples in Gujarat